The first season of Sex and the City, an American television romantic comedy-drama, aired in the United States on HBO from June 6 to August 23, 1998. Based on the eponymous book written by Candace Bushnell, the series was created by Darren Star and produced by Darren Star Productions, HBO Original Programming, and Warner Bros. Television. Star, Barry Josen and Michael Patrick King served as the series' executive producers. The show follows the relationships and sexual escapades of Carrie Bradshaw, a sex columnist for the fictional New York Star, and her friends Samantha Jones, Charlotte York and Miranda Hobbes.   

Season one, comprising 12 episodes, aired on Sunday nights at 9:00 p.m. Eastern Time Zone, except the pilot episode which aired at the same time on a Saturday night. The season garnered mixed reviews from critics. The first season garnered strong ratings for HBO in America, as well as Channel 4 in the United Kingdom, where it landed among the top 30 weekly most-watched programs. The show received several major award nominations, including an Emmy Award, a Golden Globe, and a SAG award for Best Actress in a Comedy Series for Parker.

Episodes

Crew
The first season of Sex and the City was created by Darren Star and produced by Darren Star Productions and Warner Bros. Television, in association with HBO Original Programming. The series is based on the book of the same name, written by Candace Bushnell, which contains stories from her column with the New York Observer. The show features production from Barry Jossen, Michael Patrick King, and Star. Season one featured writing credits from Star, King, Jenny Bicks, Michael Green, Jenji Kohan, Susan Kolinsky, and Terri Minsky. The season was directed by Michael Fields, Matthew Harrison, Nicole Holofcener, Alison Maclean, and Susan Seidelman.

Cast

Season one featured four actors receiving star billing. Sarah Jessica Parker played the lead character Carrie Bradshaw, a writer of a sex column, "Sex and the City", for fictional magazine and the narrator of the series. Kim Cattrall portrayed Samantha Jones, a sexually confident public relations agent who follows the same relationship rules that men do. Kristin Davis played Charlotte York, an optimistic art museum curator who holds traditional views on relationships. Cynthia Nixon portrayed Miranda Hobbes, an acerbic lawyer with a pessimistic outlook on relationship and a distrust of men.

The season featured a number of recurring guest appearances. Chris Noth appeared as the slick, elusive business man and Carrie's love interest known as Mr. Big. Willie Garson portrayed Carrie's gay best friend and talent manager Stanford Blatch. Ben Weber played Skipper Johnson, Carrie's friend and Miranda's on-off friend with benefits.

Reception

Critical reviews
Season one garnered mixed reviews from television critics, receiving an aggregated score of 52 (out of 100) at Metacritic. Caryn Lucas of The New York Times called the series "slight, breezy", "fresh and funny" while highlight Parker's performance. Terry Kelleher of People Weekly praised Parker in her role, but was against the elements of New York mixed with the theme of sex. Phil Gallo of Variety gave a mixed review of the series, criticizing the script but praising the performances of the main cast. Gallo also deemed the subplot of Carrie and Mr. Big's attraction "compelling." Earl Crassey of DVD Talk deemed the DVD release of season one "Highly Recommended", writing that "However those not easily offended should give it a spin; you will find an enjoyable and refreshing new comedy series from HBO." Crassey noted that the frank sexual dialogue and topics discussed in the series set it apart from the other sitcoms.

Viewership
In the United States, Sex and the City debuted on June 6, 1998 at 9:00 p.m. Eastern Time Zone (Saturday) with the premiere episode "Sex and the City". The episode garnered a 2.9 household rating, translating to 2.8 million households. The encore episode achieved a 3.0 rating (2.96 million households). The episode was watched by 3.84 million viewers. The season finale "Oh Come All Ye Faithful" was watched by 4.44 million viewers. The first season averaged a total viewership of 6.9 million viewers. In the United Kingdom, the series debuted on Channel 4 on February 3, 1999 to 4.53 million viewers, ranking as the third most watched program on television on the week ending February 7, 1999. The following episodes attracted between 2.5 and 4 million viewers.

UK ratings 
All viewing figures and ranks are sourced from BARB.

Awards and nominations

At the 56th Golden Globe Awards, Sarah Jessica Parker received a nomination for award for Best Actress – Television Series Musical or Comedy. At the 50th Primetime Emmy Awards, the series was nominated for Outstanding Comedy Series while Parker received a nomination for Outstanding Lead Actress in a Comedy Series. Sex and the City received seven nominations from the Online Film & Television Association for the OFTA Television Awards, including awards for 
Best New Comedy Series, Best Cable Series and Best Ensemble in a Cable Series.

Home media release
The DVD boxset for the first season was released by HBO Home Video in the United States on May 23, 2000, nearly two years since it completed its broadcast on television. The season boxset, in addition to the twelve episodes, includes features such as commentary from the cast and show creator, episode previews, and an inside look at the show. The boxset was popular in the United States, selling 1.1 million copies by 2003.

References

1998 American television seasons
Sex and the City